Bruno Bisang (born 1952 in Ascona, Switzerland) is a Swiss fashion photographer. His photography has been seen in features of many international magazines, such as Vogue, Cosmopolitan, Max, GQ and Amica, and he has shot advertising campaigns for various major fashion and beauty labels, including Chanel, Wolford, Guerlain, Palmers and Givenchy.

Career 
Bisang studied photography at the School of Applied Arts in Zurich. After an apprenticeship, he started to work as a freelance photographer in 1979, first in Zurich, later also in Milan and Munich.  Throughout his career, he has been able to shoot in: Germany, South Africa, the Caribbean, South America, Miami, New York, and Asia. Today he lives and works in Zurich, Milan, Paris and New York City.

Solo exhibitions 
 Espace Picto Bastille, Paris, 2005
 Pandora Gallery, Marbella, Spain, 2005
 Camerawork, Hamburg, 2005
 Kaune, Sudendorf Gallery, Cologne, 2011 
 Young Gallery, Brussels, 2004 and 2011
 The Little Black Gallery, London, 2012
 Kaune, Posnik, Spohr Gallery, Cologne, 2014

Publications 
 Photographs, 2000, teNeues Verlag, 
 Exposure, 2004, teNeues Verlag, 
 30 Years of Polaroids, 2011, teNeues Verlag

References

External links
 Bruno Bisang - Official Website
 photographers limited editions - Online Gallery
 Bruno Bisang at Kaune, Sudendorf Gallery, Cologne

1952 births
Living people
Swiss photographers
Fashion photographers
People from Ascona